Blanche Paymal-Amouroux (1860 – 1910) was a French painter.

Paymal-Amouroux was born in Paris. Her 1894 work A Holiday at Sosthene was included in the book Women Painters of the World. It is kept today in the Musée des Beaux-Arts de Rouen.

References

External links

1860 births
1910 deaths
Painters from Paris
French women painters
19th-century French women artists